Articles on pulverised fuel include:

 Coal dust
 Pulverized coal-fired boiler
 Pulverised fuel ash
 Pulverised fuel firing
 Pulverizer